Opération Corse was a military operation that precipitated the fall of the Fourth French Republic in 1958.

Background

The War in Algeria was going poorly, with the government of France viewed increasingly unfavorably by the French Army in Algiers. A group of rebel officers decided to take action by installing retired General Charles de Gaulle as the President of France. The prelude to this goal was to be Opération Corse.

Algiers
It started as a coup attempt led at Algiers on 13 May 1958 by a military coalition headed by Algiers deputy and reserve airborne officer Pierre Lagaillarde, Generals Raoul Salan, Edmond Jouhaud, Jean Gracieux, and Jacques Massu, and by Admiral Philippe Auboyneau, commander of the Mediterranean fleet. The putsch was supported by former Algerian Governor General Jacques Soustelle and his activist allies.

After his tour as governor general, Jacques Soustelle had returned to France to organize support for de Gaulle's return to power, while retaining close ties to the army and the settlers. By early 1958, he had organized a coup d'état, bringing together dissident army officers and colonial officials with sympathetic Gaullists. An army junta under General Jacques Massu seized power in Algiers on the night of 13 May. General Salan assumed leadership of a Committee of Public Safety formed to replace the civil authority and pressed the junta's demands that de Gaulle be named by French president René Coty to head a government of national union invested with extraordinary powers to prevent the "abandonment of Algeria." Salan announced on radio that the Army had “provisionally taken over responsibility for the destiny of French Algeria”. Under the pressure of Massu, Salan declared Vive de Gaulle ! from the balcony of the Algiers Government-General building on 15 May. De Gaulle answered two days later that he was ready to “assume the powers of the Republic”. Many worried as they saw this answer as support for the army.

Opération Corse: The invasion of Corsica
On 24 May, French paratroopers from the Algerian corps landed on Corsica by aircraft, taking the French island in a bloodless action called "Operation Corse." They met no resistance by the Gendarmerie guarding Ajaccio's airport. Subsequently, preparations were made in Algeria for "Operation Resurrection," which had as objectives the seizure of Paris and the removal of the French government, through the use of paratroopers and armoured forces based at Rambouillet.

Reaction to Opération Corse by the French government
The French government immediately resigned, and President Rene Coty appointed General de Gaulle Prime Minister, with a mandate to dismantle the Republic and erect a new one.

Notes

References

Military history of France
1958 in France
Battles in Corsica
Airborne operations
Battles and conflicts without fatalities
Conflicts in 1958